Building 429 is an American Christian rock band from Fayetteville, North Carolina. Their name is derived from a Biblical passage known as Ephesians 4:29, which, in the New International Version of the Bible, reads as follows: "Do not let any unwholesome talk come out of your mouths, but only what is helpful for building others up according to their needs, that it may benefit those who listen." The band members originated from Snyder Memorial Baptist Church and various areas in North Carolina as well as Texas.

They were named as the Gospel Music Association 2005 New Artist of the Year.

History

Early years
In late 1999, bassist Scotty Beshears and guitarist/vocalist Jason Roy met in North Carolina at the final performance of Roy's band All Too Familiar.  Beshears had formerly been involved with Elijah's Ride, another independent band. They teamed up with drummer Christian Fuhrer to form a new band which blended modern pop-rock music with Christian-themed lyrics. The trio began to perform under the name "Building 429".

According to Jason Roy, the band's name originated from a youth group. Roy's wife Cortni had once belonged to a youth group that had a system called the "429 Challenge," based on Ephesians 4:29.  Whenever someone in the group spoke negatively about another, others were allowed to issue a verbal "four twenty-nine."  This resulted in the offender having to say something nice to the person that was offended.  The band members took this challenge and created a name around it - building one another up, hence, "Building 429".

Throughout the year 2000, Building 429 held a relentless touring schedule, with over 100 shows played and 3,000 copies of their first (self-titled) CD sold. In 2001, they deepened their sound by adding a second guitarist, Paul Bowden, to their lineup.  Further success saw the band place first on Flicker Records' A&R online website and forum. Much of the band's early success can be attributed to their extensive touring schedule and tendency to write and perform upbeat, commercially-friendly pop-rock songs.

In the summer of 2002, Building 429 released the EP Preflight, featuring three rough-mixed recordings from their forthcoming second independent release and four acoustic demos.  This EP was only available at live shows and on the band's website.  In the fall of 2002, the band's second full-length independent album, entitled Flight, was released.  Initially packaged as a CD-R in a sleeve with no artwork (save for a thermal printed disc label), the album was sold at shows and through the band's website.  In 2003, the album was re-titled Building 429 and was professionally pressed and repackaged in a full-sized jewel case with complete artwork.  2002 ended with Saul Johnson replacing Chris Fuhrer as drummer.

Work with Word Records
In 2003, Building 429 continued to tour in and around North Carolina promoting their music and independent album. When Saul Johnson left the band mid-year, Michael Anderson was hired as drummer. Anderson had formerly played for Remember Jonah, a North Carolina-based Christian rock band that had played with Building 429 earlier in the year. During the summer, Building 429 joined rock worship band Sonicflood on tour. This experience would garner the band national exposure, leading to a record deal with Warner Music Group label Word Records.  Studio work immediately began on the band's major-label debut album.

"Glory Defined", Building 429's first nationally serviced radio single, rose to No. 1 on eight combined Christian AC and CHR charts in early 2004, remaining No. 1 on Christian Radio Weekly's (CRW) AC chart for ten consecutive weeks and claiming the spot faster than any single in the history of the publication.  The song was the title track from the Glory Defined EP, released April 6, 2004.  The EP featured three full-mix tracks (the title track, "Free", as well as "Show Me Love") and two "unplugged" songs, "The Space in Between Us" and "All You Ask of Me".  A second, AC mix version of "Glory Defined" was also on the EP. On July 27, 2004, Building 429's national debut, Space in Between, was released.  Produced by Jim Cooper, the album gave three more radio hits, including "Above It All", "The Space in Between Us" and "No One Else Knows".  The release of the album was followed by major touring with artists such as Jeremy Camp, Tree63, and Sonicflood.

Building 429 received four Dove Award nominations and was honored as New Artist of the Year by the Gospel Music Association in 2005.  Touring also continued alongside artists Todd Agnew, BarlowGirl, Casting Crowns and Paul Colman.  An expanded edition of Space in Between was released in August 2005, which included the full original album plus two tracks from the Glory Defined EP ("All You Ask of Me" and "Free"), the AC mix of "Glory Defined", a radio mix of "No One Else Knows" and a cover of Chris Tomlin's "Famous One".  Early in 2005, Jesse Garcia (formerly of Afterglo) was asked to fill in for guitarist Paul Bowden after Bowden suffered an elbow injury during an autograph session.  When Bowden returned, the band decided to keep Garcia on as a third guitarist and keyboardist, allowing lead vocalist Jason Roy to concentrate more on singing during concerts.  By the fall of 2005, the band was back in the studio to record their second album, Rise.

Produced by Monroe Jones, Rise (released March 14, 2006) featured a heavier sound more in line with the band's live performances.  The first singles to be released from the record included "Searching For a Savior", "Fearless" and "I Belong to You". The album also included guest vocals from former dc Talk member Michael Tait on the track "Empty" and a medley of Blessid Union of Souls' hit "I Believe" and Andraé Crouch's "Jesus is the Answer". In January 2006 it was announced that guitarist Paul Bowden would be leaving the band at the end of the month to pursue other areas of ministry.

Following the release of Rise, Building 429 headlined their own tour with TAIT, the band fronted by former dc Talk member Michael Tait.  Parts of the tour also featured Travel the Road missionaries Tim Scott and Will Decker.  In September 2006, the band returned to the studio to begin recording the follow-up album to Rise.  The end of 2006 saw Building 429 travel to Germany for their first overseas tour; shows were performed in Heidelberg, Hanau, Baumholder, and Denmark.

In January 2007, the band officially announced through its e-mail list, website and MySpace page that bassist and band founder Scotty Beshears had left the band to pursue "another chapter" in his life.  Touring bassist Aaron Branch was then hired; however, the band officially remains a threesome according to its MySpace page and website.  Recording continued throughout January for Building 429's third major studio release, entitled Iris to Iris. "Grace That is Greater", a track from the album, was made available as a digital single through the iTunes music service on March 6, 2007.  During the spring of 2007, Building 429 joined another former dc Talk member, TobyMac, on the "Portable Sounds Tour", which also featured Thousand Foot Krutch and Family Force 5.

Iris to Iris, released May 1, 2007, and produced by Brown Bannister, took the band's album lineup in a different direction. According to the band's MySpace page, Jason Roy (principal songwriter) felt that initial songwriting sessions were not turning out material that was right for the band or the project.  The band "sensed that God was calling them in a new direction." After praying about the circumstances and the music they were creating, the band made the decision to strictly focus the songs on God.  After that, according to Roy, "the songs just started to flow. It was the easiest, most fulfilling, and most fun songwriting process we have ever experienced."  The resulting 11-track Iris to Iris became a collection of original worship songs and two hymn reworkings ("Grace That is Greater" and "Search Me O God"), making for a mellower and more ethereal-sounding record than past recordings from the group.  Building 429 also saw a change in writing, as band members Michael Anderson and Jesse Garcia joined Jason Roy in the songwriting process, along with veteran Christian songwriter Chris Eaton (Amy Grant, Point of Grace, and Jaci Velasquez).

In May 2007 the band embarked on a month-long schedule of tour dates with up-and-coming band Jackson Waters to promote Iris to Iris.  After performing a few festivals in the summer, Building 429 continued with a second leg of their touring with Jackson Waters, adding Storyside:B and 2006 GMA New Artist of the Year The Afters to the performance lineup.  Touring continued in 2008 with Pillar, Wavorly and Brooke Barrettsmith. on Pillar's "For the Love of the Game" tour (February 22 – April 6), and with Remedy Drive and Bread of Stone on the LifeLight Communications' "Lifelight" tour (April 9–19).

On February 16, 2008, Building 429 announced a fan contest on its official Myspace page.  A link was provided to a contest Web page which listed four requirements, of which fans with Myspace profiles were asked to complete two. These requirements included adding a Building 429 rotating web banner to the contestant's profile, adding the song "Singing Over Me" to the contestant's profile, putting Building 429 in the contestant's "Top 8 Friends" and changing the default profile picture to Building 429's default profile picture.  Each Monday beginning February 18, 2008, a contestant was chosen as the weekly winner and received a T-shirt, a copy of the Iris to Iris album, a signed poster and a drumstick. Winners were announced by name in blog posts on Building 429's Myspace page.  On April 14, a grand prize winner was chosen to win an iPod Nano.

On July 3, 2008, the band released Glory Defined: The Best of Building 429, a greatest hits collection from the albums under the Word Records label.  The CD contained all previously released tracks.

Work with INO Records
A press release dated September 10, 2008, stated that Building 429 had moved to INO Records after almost five years with Word Records. The self-titled album Building 429 was released on October 21, 2008, to mark the "new beginning" of the band with the new label. "End of Me" was the first single from the new album to be released to Christian AC and CHR radio outlets, followed by "Always". Soul-Audio, a Christian music publication, granted the album an average score, speaking highly of the band by saying "Forget the future—the present is pretty bright for this trio."

Work with Essential Records
Building 429 started out with Essential Records by releasing Listen to the Sound. Throughout 2011 and 2012, Building 429 released new singles "Listen to the Sound", "Right Beside You" and "Where I Belong". The single, "Where I Belong" was No. 1 on the Billboard NCA charts and was named the 2013 Billboard Magazine Christian Song of the Year.

On June 4, 2013, Building 429 released We Won't Be Shaken, their eighth studio album. The CD debuted at No. 1 on the Billboard Christian Albums chart.

On April 29, 2015 (in celebration of 4/29), Building 429 released "Impossible" as the single for their ninth studio album, Unashamed, which was released in September 2015.

3rd Wave Music

In 2019, Building 429 started an independent label called 3rd Wave Music which they currently release all of their material under.

Tours 

 2007 - SHOUTfest Tour with After Edmund and other various artists (September–November)
 2008 - For the Love of the Game Tour with Pillar, Wavorly, and Brooke Barrettsmith
 2008 – Truth, Hope & Love Tour with Addison Road and After Edmund
 2009 - Truth, Hope & Love Tour with After Edmund, Above the Golden State, Kimber Rising, and Mile 7 (February–March)
 2009 - World Vision Summerfest '09 with 33 Miles, Lanae' Hale and Kimber Rising
 2009 - The Promise Remains Tour with Todd Agnew and Kimber Rising (September–December)
 2010 - World Vision Winterblast Tour with Britt Nicole, Mikeschair, and Chris and Conrad
 2010 - World Vision Canada Tour co-headlined with Big Daddy Weave
 2010 - Food for the Hungry Summerfest with Britt Nicole, Mikeschair, and Finding Favour
 2011 - Listen to the Sound tour with Revive and Anthem Lights
 2011 - Food for the Hungry Winterblast 2011 with 33 Miles, Jason Gray, and Kerrie Roberts
 2012 - WinterJam Tour Spectacular with Skillet, NewSong, Sanctus Real, Peter Furler, Kari Jobe, Group 1 Crew, Dara Maclean, For King & Country (band), and We As Human.
 2012 - Faith, Family, and Freedom Celebration with Laura Story, Sidewalk Prophets, and Mark Schultz
 2012 - Newsboy's God's Not Dead Tour with Newsboys, Luminate, and Grace Campbell
 2012 - Newsong's A Very Merry Christmas Tour with NewSong, Francesca Battistelli, and Jonny Diaz
 2013 - United We Stand Tour with The Afters and Hawk Nelson. With special guest Finding Favour.
 2013 - Winter Jam Tour Spectacular with Newsboys, Dara Maclean, Everfound, Love & The Outcome, Tenth Avenue North, Passion ft. Kristian Stanfill, and Crowder.
 2014 - We Won't Be Shaken Tour with Family Force 5 and Hawk Nelson. With special guests Satellites & Sirens and Lybecker. A second leg of the tour was announced in late 2014, with Love & the Outcome and special guests Cadence and Humble Tip.
2018 - I Am A Christian Tour ft. New Song, Citizen Way, and Caitie Hurst. 
2019 - Live the Journey Tour ft. Blanca, Stars Go Dim, The Color, We Are Vessel, and Sanctus Real.
2019 - A Thrill of Hope Tour

Band members
Current
 Jason Roy – lead vocals, keyboards and guitar (1999–present)
 Michael Anderson – drums (2003–present)
 Aaron Branch – bass guitar, background vocals (2007–present)
 Steven Stewart – keyboards (2018–present)

Former
 Christian Führer – drums (2000–2002)
 Saul Johnson – drums (2002–2003)
 Paul Bowden – guitars (2001–2006)
 Scotty Beshears – bass guitar (2000–2007)
 Brooke Deleary – background vocals (2019–2021)
 Jesse Garcia – background vocals, keyboards, and guitar (2005–2022)

Discography 

 2000: Building 429
 2002: Flight
 2004: Space in Between Us
 2006: Rise
 2007: Iris to Iris
 2008: Building 429
 2011: Listen to the Sound
 2013: We Won't Be Shaken
 2015: Unashamed
 2018: Live the Journey

Awards

In 2005, Building 429 was nominated to three Dove Awards at the 36th GMA Dove Awards: New Artist of the Year, Song of the Year ("Glory Defined"), and Rock/Contemporary Recorded Song of the Year for the same song. It ended up winning New Artist of the Year.

At the 56th Annual Grammy Awards, their We Won't Be Shaken was nominated for "Best Contemporary Christian Music Album".

References

External links
 
 Building 429 at PureVolume
 Review: Building 429, Iris to Iris
 Soul-Audio Review: Building 429, Building 429
 Building 429 Fans Embrace “You Carried Me” Contest Promotion

 

American Christian rock groups
Rock music groups from North Carolina
Essential Records (Christian) artists
Musical groups established in 1999
1999 establishments in North Carolina